Donald's Crime is a 1945 American animated short film produced by Walt Disney Productions and released by RKO Radio Pictures. The cartoon, which parodies film noir crime dramas of the time, follows Donald Duck as he struggles with guilt after stealing $1.25 from his nephews. The film was directed by Jack King and features original music by Edward H. Plumb. The voice cast includes Clarence Nash as Donald, Huey, Dewey, and Louie, Gloria Blondell as Daisy Duck, and Sterling Holloway as the off-stage voice of Donald's conscience. This was Blondell's first performance as Daisy and marks the debut of the character's "normal" voice. Previously in Mr. Duck Steps Out, Daisy had been voiced by Nash using a voice similar to Donald's.

Donald's Crime was nominated for an Academy Award for Best Animated Short Film at the 18th Academy Awards in 1946, but lost to Quiet Please!, a Tom and Jerry short produced by MGM. It was the fourth such nomination for the Donald Duck film series.

Plot
One evening, while eagerly awaiting a date with Daisy, Donald realizes he is short of money. He catches sight of Huey, Dewey, and Louie's piggy bank, and following a brief battle with his conscience, he takes it. After sending his nephews to bed, Donald breaks the piggy bank open, takes the money, and goes on to have a wonderful time with Daisy at a local nightclub.

Later that evening, Donald drops Daisy off at her house and starts to walk home. He feels prideful at first, but then his conscience returns and calls him a gangster, reminding him that bank robbery is a federal crime. Donald starts to imagine that federal agents are chasing him and he starts to run. As the film continues, his visions become more nightmarish and desperate. At last, Donald corners himself in a dark alley and believes he is in prison. He frantically grabs the bars of a door window and shakes it. A sign falls off and hits him in the head. It's a 'help wanted' sign, and Donald discovers the door is the service entrance of an all night cafe. Donald works through the night and earns enough money to pay back his nephews, except when he returns the money to the piggy bank, he accidentally returns $1.30 of the original $1.25. When the nephews wake up, they see Donald trying to take a nickel from the piggy bank and begin to complain. Donald's conscience reminds him, "You see, chum? Crime doesn't pay."

Voice cast
 Donald Duck and nephews: Clarence Nash
 Daisy Duck: Ruth Clifford
 Donald's Conscience: Harry E. Lang

Censorship
The scene that shows Donald's nephews playing with toy guns was cut in this film for being too violent. Another scene that sees Donald smoking his cigar was also cut in this film due to usage of tobacco.

Releases
1945 – Original theatrical release
1961 – Walt Disney's Wonderful World of Color, episode #8.6: "Inside Donald Duck" (TV)
c. 1983 – Good Morning, Mickey!, episode #63
1984 – Donald 50th Birthday; however, Spanish, Donald's international appeal
c. 1992 – Mickey's Mouse Tracks, episode #28 (TV)
c. 1992 – Donald's Quack Attack, episode #11 (TV)
1998 – The Ink and Paint Club, episode #1.34: "Donald's Nephews" (TV)

Home media
The short was released on December 6, 2005 on Walt Disney Treasures: The Chronological Donald, Volume Two: 1942-1946.

Additional releases include:
1984 – "Cartoon Classics: More of Disney's Best: 1932-1946" (VHS)
2002 – Bonus on DVD of The Great Mouse Detective (DVD)
2006 – Classic Cartoon Favorites: Best Pals: Donald and Daisy (DVD)
2010 – iTunes download

References

1940s English-language films
1945 animated films
1945 short films
American animated short films
1940s Disney animated short films
1940s crime films
Donald Duck short films
American crime films
Films directed by Jack King
Films produced by Walt Disney
American parody films
RKO Pictures short films
RKO Pictures animated short films
Films about ducks
Film noir cartoons